Johnny Drummer (born Thessex Johns, March 1, 1938) is an American Chicago blues and soul blues singer, keyboardist, drummer, harmonica player, and songwriter. His stage name came after he saw the film Johnny Guitar, at a time when his chosen instrument was the drums.

Drummer has released three albums.

Life and career
Drummer was born and raised in Alligator, Mississippi, and sang in his church at the age of seven. He visited his mother in Chicago, Illinois, in 1954 and 1955, and joined the U.S. Army the following year. He learned to play the drums during his three-year period of duty. By 1959, he had relocated to Chicago, where he remains to the present.

In 1960, he joined a band containing Lovie Lee and Carey Bell. He later played drums for about a year for Eddie King.  After forming his own band, the Starliters, Drummer recorded two tracks, "Lookin' for My Baby" and "I Can't Stop Twisting," for a local record label, Wonderful Records, but they were never released. In 1965, he recorded vocal overdubs on two tracks for Billy "The Kid" Emerson, but these also were not issued. During the 1960s, the Starliters at various times included Sammy Lawhorn and Eddie Shaw. Drummer also played on several of Eddie King's singles, and in 1965 he once played with B.B. King at a concert when King's regular drummer did not arrive. Drummer was reluctantly pressed to sing in his own band, leaving regular drum playing to others.

In 1974, Drummer obtained full-time employment with the Chicago Police Department, where he worked for twenty years. However, he continued to play music in the evenings, having learned the rudiments of harmonica playing from Junior Wells. In the late 1970s, he recorded  "The Fire Is Gone" and "I'll Find a Way," which were released as a single by Abco Records. By 1985 he had switched to playing keyboards, and he and his band opened for many musicians, including Denise LaSalle, Z.Z. Hill, Koko Taylor, Tyrone Davis and Willie Mabon.

Drummer's debut album, It's So Nice, was released by Earwig in 1999. The music critic Cub Koda noted, "his knack for a catchy phrases and lyrical hooks coupled with funky grooves and solid instrumental mixes makes this album a real sleeper". His subsequent albums are Unleaded Blues (2001) and Rockin' in the Juke Joint (2007).

Discography

Albums

See also
List of Chicago blues musicians
List of soul-blues musicians

References

1938 births
Living people
American blues singers
American male singers
American blues pianists
American male pianists
American blues harmonica players
Chicago blues musicians
Soul-blues musicians
Songwriters from Mississippi
Blues musicians from Mississippi
Singers from Chicago
Songwriters from Illinois
20th-century American drummers
American male drummers
20th-century American pianists
21st-century American pianists
20th-century American male musicians
21st-century American male musicians
Earwig Music artists
People from Bolivar County, Mississippi
American male songwriters